Spring Branch is a  long 1st order tributary to the Murderkill River in Kent County, Delaware.

Course
Spring Branch rises on the Fan Branch divide about 1 mile south of Felton, Delaware.  Spring Branch then flows east to meet the Murderkill River about 0.5 miles southeast of Roesville, Delaware.

Watershed
Spring Branch drains  of area, receives about 45.1 in/year of precipitation, has a topographic wetness index of 569.99 and is about 9.8% forested.

See also
List of Delaware rivers

Maps

References

Rivers of Delaware
Rivers of Kent County, Delaware
Tributaries of the Murderkill River